Turkey hunting is a sport involving the pursuit of the elusive wild turkey. Long before the European settlers arrived in North America, the Native Americans took part in hunting wild turkeys.

History

By the early 1900s, the turkey population had been decimated in North America because of habitat destruction, commercial hunting, and wildlife regulations.  Hunters, wildlife agencies and conservation organizations intervened and turkey populations rebounded dramatically. More than 7 million wild turkeys now roam North America, with populations in every U.S. state but Alaska. Wild turkeys are also hunted in parts of Mexico and Canada.

Species and subspecies

There are two species of turkey pursued as game animals in North America, the wild turkey (Meleagris gallopavo) and the ocellated turkey (Meleagris ocellata).  The wild turkey is further divided into six subspecies.  To harvest a bird from the Eastern, Osceola, Rio Grande, and Merriam's wild turkey subspecies is known in turkey hunting circles as a "grand slam". Harvesting a bird from all the subspecies in the "grand slam" as well as the Gould's wild turkey subspecies and the ocellated turkey is known as a "world slam".

Techniques and equipment

Depending on local rules and regulations, the wild turkey is hunted either in the spring or fall.  Spring hunts target gobblers (male turkeys) and fall hunts usually target either sex. Spring hunting coincides with the wild turkey mating season, where gobblers can be called into gun range with calls that mimic the sounds of a hen.  Fall seasons occur when turkeys are in flocks, and the typical fall hunt strategy is to "bust up" or "scatter" a flock of turkeys, and then use turkey calls to encourage the scattered birds to group back up together.

The shotgun is a popular weapon for hunting wild turkey. Shotgun gauges used in turkey hunting include 10, 12, 16, and 20 gauge.#2, #4, #5, and #6 lead shot is often used in 2 3/4", 3", or 3 1/2" shotshells. Bow and arrow is starting to become popular among hunters. Common hunting broadheads are used for body shots while "guillotine" style broadheads are intended to remove the head with the shot. Some states even allow small caliber rifles to be used while pursuing turkeys. Turkey hunters usually wear full camouflage, from head to toe, to conceal themselves from the wild turkey's excellent eyesight. This includes pants, shirt, hat, boots, gloves, and a mask. Many hunters wear a turkey vest with a cushion to sit on and compartments to carry their calls and dead turkeys.

Calls used in turkey hunting fall into two categories, air and friction activated. Air calls include diaphragms, wingbone calls, Turpin yelpers, trumpet calls, and snuff tube calls.  Friction calls include box calls, pot and peg calls, scratch boxes, and push pin calls. These calls are relatively easy to use and even a beginner can use them to call in turkeys.
Common locator calls include owl hooters, crow calls, hawk calls, and anything that will produce a loud noise. This causes a turkey to "shock" gobble and give away his location.

Scent control also contributes to the turkey hunter's technique. While artificial or synthetic scents like those used by hunters of deer and other game are not typically utilized while hunting turkey, removal or masking of foreign scents from the hunter and his equipment is a technique which is commonly used by hunters of wild turkey.

Turkey hunters will often "owl" to shock a gobbler into gobbling. To do this, you can either use your voice or you can even use a specific call to produce the sound. Crows will also shock a gobbler into gobbling. When the gobbler gobbles, he gives away his location so you can sneak up on him and get close and "call him up". In the past couple of years many turkey hunters have started using decoys to make it seem like a "jake"— a young gobbler— is trying to breed a hen. When a dominant gobbler sees that, he gets territorial and aggressive because he wants to breed the hen rather than a youngster. There is no single decoy that covers every possible situation.

In a typical hunting scenario, either with a shotgun or a bow, the hunter waits for the dominant male, or "tom", to get within range. Oftentimes in the Spring, the dominant male will come within range while in "strut". The hunter will then wait for a time where the Wild Turkey is parallel to their position and the side of the head is exposed. This affords the hunter an opportunity to harvest the bird with a clean shot in order to make the harvest quick. Additionally, this has the benefit of ensuring that the "shot" from the shotgun does not penetrate the meat nor shred the feathers during the harvest.

See also
 Hunting
 Wild turkey

References

Bird hunting
Hunting by game